Mister Supranational 2023 will be the 7th edition of the Mister Supranational pageant to be held on July 15, 2023. Luis Daniel Gálvez of Cuba will crown his successor at the end of the event.

Background 
Starting from 2023, the Miss Supranational Organization have decided to accept men from the ages of 20 to 34 years old to participate in the pageant.

Pre-finals virtual activities

Contestants
As of 18 March 2023, 14 contestants have been confirmed:

Upcoming pageants

Notes

Returns 
Last competed in 2021:

References

External links
 

2023
2023 beauty pageants